Kistler is an unincorporated community and census-designated place (CDP) in Logan County, West Virginia, United States. As of the 2010 census, its population was 528.

Geography
It is bordered to the northeast (upstream) by Accoville.

The community was affected by the Buffalo Creek flood in 1972.

References

Census-designated places in Logan County, West Virginia
Census-designated places in West Virginia
Coal towns in West Virginia